Ekaterine "Kato" Mikeladze (1878–1942) was a Georgian journalist and feminist who from 1916 fought for women's rights. In order to encourage women to become politically active, she established The Inter-Partial League of Women backed by The Voice of Georgian Women, a newspaper she founded and edited, publishing articles on social and political issues. Thanks to her efforts, in 1919 five women were among the elected members of Georgia's parliament following the country's first democratic election.

Biography
Born in 1878 in Kutaisi, Mikeladze completed her school education at the city's St. Nino School. In 1898, already a committed feminist, she responded to assertions of women's limited intelligence by commenting in the journal Kvali: "The [emancipation] movement will continue until the root causes are eradicated. Science shows the causes of economic and political inequality do not result from inequality in ability or intelligence." She went on to study in Moscow (1903) and in Brussels, graduating in Social and Political Sciences.

She then spent several years in Paris where she followed developments in women's involvement in politics, including the activities of the British National Union of Women's Suffrage Societies and Women's Social and Political Union. Back in Kutaisi in 1916, she strove to improve women's participation in politics by establishing the Inter-Partial League of Women and The Voice of Georgian Women, a newspaper promoting the social and political views of women from Georgia and elsewhere in Europe.

See also
List of Georgian women writers

References 

1878 births
1942 deaths
People from Kutaisi
19th-century writers from Georgia (country)
20th-century writers from Georgia (country)
20th-century women writers from Georgia (country)
19th-century women writers from Georgia (country)
Feminists from Georgia (country)
Suffragists from Georgia (country)
Women's rights activists from Georgia (country)